Igor Gniecki (born 16 April 2002) is a Polish volleyball player who plays as a setter.

Sporting achievements

Clubs 
Polish Championship U19:
  2019

National team 
FIVB Men's U21 World Championship:
  2021

References

External links
 PlusLiga profile
 Volleybox profile
 VolleyballWorld profile
 CEV profile
 CEV profile

2002 births
Living people
Polish men's volleyball players